Iowa's 9th congressional district existed from 1873 to 1943.  The district was configured four times, first as part of a nine-district plan, then twice in eleven-district plans, then again in a nine-district plan.  In the nine-district plans, the Ninth District encompassed the northwestern corner of Iowa, but in the eleven-district plans it encompassed Council Bluffs and nine surrounding counties.

Phase one: 1873–1883
Based on the 1870 census, Iowa's U.S. House delegation increased from six to nine members, requiring the Iowa General Assembly to reapportion the districts.  Because the northwestern area of the state was relatively less populous, its congressional district (the ninth) was by far the largest, encompassing more than a quarter of the state's 99 counties, and running from the Minnesota border on the north and the Missouri River on the west to Story County, location of the state's geographic center.  In this phase, the Ninth District included Hamilton, Story, Boone, Webster, Humboldt, Kossuth, Emmet, Palo Alto, Pocahontas, Calhoun, Greene, Carroll, Sac, Buena Vista, Clay, Dickinson, Osceola, O'Brien, Cherokee, Ida, Crawford, Monona, Woodbury, Plymouth, Sioux, and Lyon counties. It included the growing cities of Sioux City, Fort Dodge, and Ames. 
During this period, the district was represented by Republicans Jackson Orr of Boone County, S. Addison Oliver of Monona County, and Cyrus Carpenter of Webster County.

Phase two: 1883 to 1887
The 1880 census caused Iowa to receive two more seats in the House, requiring reapportionment of the state into eleven districts.  The former Ninth District in northwestern Iowa was generally divided to create the new 11th and 10th districts.  When southwest and south-central Iowa were divided among four districts rather than three, the new Ninth District was created. It included Crawford County (of the old Ninth District) and Harrison, Shelby, Audubon, Pottawattamie, Cass, Mills, Montgomery, and Fremont counties (of the old Eighth District).  It included Council Bluffs in Pottawattamie County, across the Missouri River from Omaha, Nebraska and the historical starting point of the transcontinental railroad.

Only two elections were held under this configuration.  Voters elected Democrat William Henry Mills Pusey, then replaced him with Republican Joseph Lyman, both of Council Bluffs.

Phase three:  1887 to 1933
The Iowa General Assembly soon readjusted the boundaries of the eleven-district map, allegedly to increase the number of Republican victories.  Those boundaries would remain in place for 45 years.  Fremont County was shifted from the Ninth into the Eighth District, thereby setting the stage for the stunning 1886 upset of incumbent Eighth District Republican Congressman William Peters Hepburn by Fremont County's Independent Republican, Albert R. Anderson.  Crawford County was added to the Tenth District, and two counties from Iowa's 7th congressional district (Guthrie and Adair) were added to the Ninth.

Lyman retained his seat after reapportionment, and he was followed by Joseph Rea Reed, Thomas Bowman, Alva L. Hager, Smith McPherson, Walter I. Smith, William R. Green, Earl W. Vincent, and Charles Swanson. All were Republican lawyers except Bowman, a Democratic newspaperman. All were from Council Bluffs except Hager (from Adair County), McPherson (from Montgomery County), Green (from Audubon County), and Vincent (from Guthrie County).

The General Assembly's 45-year failure to reapportion congressional districts resulted in malapportionment, which was particularly severe in certain districts in Iowa. Residents of three other southern Iowa districts (the 1st, 6th, and 8th) gained in per capita influence as the districts' population growth slowed or reversed. The 9th district did not decline in political influence as much as districts that were oversized for too long (like the 10th and 11th) and districts with Iowa's largest cities (like the 2nd, 3rd and 7th).  Instead, it was one of three Iowa districts that, by 1920, deviated less than a ten percent from the ideal "one person, one vote" population.

Phase four: 1933 to 1943
The 1930 census reflected that Iowa, like other rural Great Plains states, had not grown as much as states such as California, causing Iowa to lose seats in Congress for the first time.  It lost two seats, forcing the Republican-dominated 1931 General Assembly to adopt a nine-district plan.  As in 1872, the Ninth District included Sioux City and the northwestern corner of Iowa, but this time it included only thirteen counties (Dickinson, Clay, Buena Vista, Sac, Ida, Cherokee, O'Brien, Osceola, Lyon, Sioux, Plymouth, Woodbury, and Monona).

The first election under the nine-district plan, in 1932, coincided with the Franklin D. Roosevelt landslide, causing a northwestern Iowa Democrat (Guy M. Gillette of Cherokee County) to win a congressional race for only the second time ever.  When Gillette ran for the U.S. Senate he was succeeded by another Democrat, Vincent Harrington of Sioux City.  When Harrington could not complete the term he won in 1940 after he resigned to join the U.S. Army Air Corps in 1942, Republican Dickinson County Judge Harry E. Narey served the final six weeks of his term.

The district was eliminated after the 1940 census. All of the district was renamed the 8th district with the exception of Monona County, which was placed in the 7th district.

List of members representing the district

See also
Iowa's congressional districts

References

 Congressional Biographical Directory of the United States 1774–present

06
Former congressional districts of the United States
1873 establishments in Iowa
1943 disestablishments in Iowa